Dameron is an unincorporated community in Lincoln County, in the U.S. state of Missouri.

History
A post office called Dameron was established in 1880, and remained in operation until 1909. An early postmaster gave the community his last name.

References

Unincorporated communities in Lincoln County, Missouri
Unincorporated communities in Missouri